Lin Chang-lun (born 28 June 1991) is a Taiwanese footballer who currently plays as a forward at the national and club level. Lin is a member of the Amis people and has served in the armed forces, although he cut his time short in the army to focus on his football career.

International goals
.Scores and results are list Taiwan's goal tally first.

References

1991 births
Living people
Taiwanese footballers
Chinese Taipei international footballers
Taiwan Power Company F.C. players
People from Hualien County
Amis people
Association football forwards